The National Board of Revenue (NBR) is the Central Authority for Tax Administration in Bangladesh.  It is a Statutory Authority attached with the Internal Resources Division of Ministry of Finance.  NBR is the Authority for Tax Policies and Tax Laws in Bangladesh. NBR collects almost 97% of Tax Revenue and almost 85% of total Revenue for the Government of Bangladesh.

History
The NBR was established in 1972 through the National Board of Revenue Order, 1972. Later, the structure of the NBR was amended through Act No 12 of 2009.

Structure
The NBR has 1 Chairperson and 8 members - 4 for direct tax and 4 for indirect tax. The secretary of internal resources division acts as the ex-officio chairman of the Board. There are 45 departments/directorates under the NBR, of which 25 are related to direct tax and 20 related to indirect tax.

References

External links
 

Bangladeshi intelligence agencies
Revenue services
1972 establishments in Bangladesh
Taxation in Bangladesh